Otto Ernst Schweizer (27 April 1890 – 14 November 1965) was a German architect. His work was part of the architecture event in the art competition at the 1932 Summer Olympics.

References

1890 births
1965 deaths
20th-century German architects
Olympic competitors in art competitions
People from Schramberg